Lists of dukes include:

 List of dukes in the peerages of Britain and Ireland
 List of dukes in Europe
 List of dukes in the nobility of Italy
 List of dukes in the peerage of Spain

See also
 Lists of dukedoms